Theodor "Thore" Magnus Fries (28 October 1832 – 29 March 1913), was a Swedish botanist, lichenologist, and Arctic explorer. He was the son of the mycologist Elias Fries.

Following in his father's footsteps, Fries studied botany, obtaining his doctoral degree in 1857 at Uppsala. He is credited for introducing the term  in a commentary about the genus lichen genus Stereocaulon in an 1858 publication. He became a member of the Royal Swedish Academy of Sciences in 1865 and professor of botany and applied economics at Uppsala in 1877. His most notable work was Lichenographia scandinavica (1871–1874). He also produced a two-volume biography of Carl Linnaeus (1903).

Fries was part of two Arctic expeditions led by Adolf Erik Nordenskiöld, in 1868 and 1871. From 1893 to 1899, he was the vice-chancellor of Uppsala University. His sons Thore Christian Elias Fries and Robert Elias Fries also became botanists.

See also
 :Category:Taxa named by Theodor Magnus Fries

References

External links
Th. M. Fries (1832-1913), a Grand Scandinavian Lichenologist. The Bryologist 104 (4):537-542  
Works by Theodor Magnus Fries
Biography (Mushroom the Journal)

Botanists with author abbreviations
Swedish botanists
Members of the Royal Swedish Academy of Sciences
1913 deaths
1832 births
Burials at Uppsala old cemetery